The Mazari (singular Mazrouei or Mazrui) is a tribe of the United Arab Emirates (UAE). The Mazari settled throughout the Trucial States but principally in Abu Dhabi. They are considered a subsection of the Bani Yas and formed the majority of the Bedouin component of that federation of tribes.

Liwa 
The Liwa Oasis was the homeplace of many of the Mazari, where they were the principal property owners of the six Bani Yas tribes in the area, consisting of some 315 houses at the turn of the 20th century. They were closely associated with the AlMarar tribe at Liwa. At that time there were also some 300 Mazari at Al Khan in Sharjah and 500 in the areas of Adhen and Asimah. Those of the Mazari who settled in Dubai came to consider themselves as apart from the Bani Yas. The area around Wadi Helou in the Hajar Mountains of Sharjah is also an area of Mazari settlement.

They were herdsmen and records show they settled into an agrarian existence in the oasis following the decline in the value of camels and the use of traditional camel trains which took place in the Trucial States during the early 20th century. They were also involved in the seasonal pearl fisheries. Like their Bedouin counterparts the Manasir, many Mazari found employment in the burgeoning oil industry as modernisation forced changes in the lifestyle of the Bedouin of the area. The Mazari also formed the second largest Bedouin contingent among the Ruler's retainers, being said to be loyal and "in their bedu fashion, disciplined."

Conflict and schism 
When Sheikh Saeed bin Tahnun Al Nahyan repelled the Wahhabis from the Buraimi Oasis in 1848, it was the Mazari, together with the Manasir, who waited South of Abu Dhabi to fall on the relieving force send from Nejd under Saad bin Mutlaq. The two tribes were also linked in events further north, where they were involved in a conflict with the wali of Al Khan, Muhamad bin Ubaid in 1920. Some 75 pearling boats sailed from Al Khan each season, owned by settled Mazari and Manasir families. However, the village was frequently plundered by Bedouin Mazari and Al Bu Shamis, the Ruler of Sharjah, Sheikh Sultan bin Saqr Al Qasimi, and the wali being accused of doing little to protect the village, whilst also insisting on a tribute of 50 bags of rice at the commencement of each pearling season. When the wali died in 1931, the village appointed its own headman – a move which was punished by Sultan bin Saqr, who replaced the murdered headman with his brother Muhammad.

An outbreak of hostilities between the Bedouin tribes of Dhafra (the area between Abu Dhabi and the Rub Al Kali) in the early 20th century rumbled on until the early 1920s, with the Mazari split between a group who sought Saudi protection and a group who migrated to Abu Dhabi and its islands. After Sheikh Hamdan bin Zayed Al Nahyan arranged a truce, the Mazari returned to Dhafra but fighting between the tribes continued: a conflict used by Abdelaziz Ibn Saud of Saudi Arabia to increase his influence over the tribes and exact the tax zakat from them. These shifting allegiances and schisms were to form part of the Saudi claims which led to the Buraimi Dispute.

Prominent Mazari today 
A prominent UAE trading and  industrial family; one of its most notable members is the UAE's Minister of State for Youth Affairs, Shamma bint Suhail Faris Al Mazrui who, in February 2016, became the youngest government minister in the world. The Emirati businessman and UAE Minister of Energy & Industry, and Member of the Executive Committee of the Supreme Petroleum Council, Suhail Al Mazroui Suhail Mohammed Faraj Al Mazroui. Another prominent Mazari is: Sheikha Shamsa bint Suhail Al Mazrouei, the wife of the Sheikh Khalifa bin Zayed Al Nahyan, the President the UAE and ruler of Abu Dhabi.

References 

Tribes of the United Arab Emirates